Haki is a village in Rõuge Parish, Võru County in Estonia. The population has been 7 since 2021.

References

Villages in Võru County